Phanindranath Rangarajan Kumaramangalam (12 May 1952 – 23 August 2000) was a prominent politician of the Indian National Congress and later the Bharatiya Janata Party and a Member of parliament, Lok Sabha from the Salem constituency from 1984 to 1996 and Tiruchirapalli constituency from 1998 to 2000. He served as the Minister of State for Law, Justice and Company Affairs in the P. V. Narasimha Rao government from July 1991 to December 1993 and as the Union Minister for Power in the Vajpayee Government from 1998 to 2000. He was the grandson of former Chief Minister of Madras, P. Subbarayan and the nephew of former Indian Chief of Army, General P. P. Kumaramangalam.

Personal life 

Rangarajan was born on 12 May 1952 in the Zamindari family of Kumaramangalam, in Tiruchengode Taluk, Namakkal District.  His grandfather Paramasiva Subbarayan was the Chief Minister (Premier) of the then Madras presidency from 1925 to 1930 and a Cabinet Minister under later Governments. His uncle, General P.P. Kumaramangalam was a veteran of the Second World War and a former Chief of Army Staff. Rangarajan's father Mohan Kumaramangalam was an important theorist and organiser of the undivided Communist Party of India and later switched to Indian National Congress influenced by the socialist policies of then Prime Minister Indira Gandhi and served as Union Cabinet Minister for Steel & Mines in her cabinet. His mother Kalyani Mukherjee was the niece of Ajoy Mukherjee, Chief Minister of West Bengal, and of Biswanath Mukherjee, husband of the communist ideologue and parliamentarian Geeta Mukherjee.

Politics 

Ranga was deeply involved in student politics right from the earliest stages, as one of the founding members and the first president of the National Students Union of India (NSUI). It was no less a person than Prime Minister Indira Gandhi, whose great personal favourite he was, who called him to take up this post after going through due process. By 1973, he had also been elected a member of the All India Congress Committee. In 1977, on obtaining a degree from Kirori Mal College, Delhi University, he moved to Madras to practice in labour law. When the Congress was re-elected in 1980, Rangarajan was asked by his very dear friend, soon-to-be-Prime Minister Rajiv Gandhi, to play an active role in politics. He contested and won the 1984 elections from Salem Lok Sabha constituency.

P.V. Narasimha Rao appointed him Minister of State for Law, Justice and Company Affairs in July 1991. Despite his personal sense of loyalty to Narasimha Rao, Ranga was unable to support him in what was increasingly being seen as a corrupt Congress regime. In a letter to the President he raised several issues with regards to corruption allegedly perpetrated by the Prime Minister, based on documents he had in his possession and that formed the basis of the Vohra Committee report. In this letter he asked the President to ask the Prime Minister to step down and face an investigation against the charges.

In late 1993, Rangarajan resigned as Cabinet Minister. In May 1995, Rangarajan resigned from the primary membership of the Indian National Congress and along with Arjun Singh, N.D. Tiwari, Sheila Dikshit and others, founded the Congress(T). However, Rangarajan lost his seat in the 1996 Parliamentary elections during which his new party suffered a crushing defeat. In December 1997, Rangarajan joined the Bharatiya Janata Party. He won from the Tiruchirapalli Lok Sabha constituency in 1998 and 1999 and became one of the torch-bearers of the BJP in Tamil Nadu. He served with distinction as the Union Minister for Power and Parliamentary Affairs, holding additional charge of Law, Justice and Company Affairs, and Mines, in the Second Vajpayee Ministry from 1998 to 1999 and in the Third Vajpayee Ministry from 1999 until his death in 2000.

Death 

Rangarajan died on 23 August 2000 at the All India Institute of Medical Sciences at the age of 48 as a result of acute myeloid leukaemia (blood cancer). At the time of his death, he was the Power Minister in the then A. B. Vajpayee ministry. He was cremated with full state honours on the same day.

See also

 Political Families of The World

References 

 Ranga cremated with full state honours, Rediff.com, 23 August 2000
 Politician with a hearth of Gold, Tribute by K.Srinivasan, Rediff.com, 23 August 2000
 'I think some poison had entered his body, and was eating up his body' Rediff.com interview with Kitty Kumaramangalam, wife of Rangarajan Kumaramangalam on 22 September 2000*
 BJP fields Lalitha Kumaramangalam from Pondicherry, Yahoo News, 21 February 2004

Footnotes

External links 
 

1952 births
2000 deaths
Kirori Mal College alumni
People from Salem district
Indian amateur radio operators
Indian National Congress politicians from Tamil Nadu
Union Ministers from Tamil Nadu
Tamil lawyers
Bharatiya Janata Party politicians from Tamil Nadu
India MPs 1984–1989
India MPs 1989–1991
India MPs 1991–1996
India MPs 1998–1999
India MPs 1999–2004
Lok Sabha members from Tamil Nadu
Rangarajan
Deaths from cancer in India
People from Tiruchirappalli district
Ministers of Power of India